Ab Barik-e Olya (also Romanized as Āb Barīk-e ‘Olyā and Āb Barīk ‘Olyā; also known as Āb Bārīk, Āb Bārīk-e Bālā, Obalik, and Obalik Bāla ) is a village in Bala Rokh Rural District, Jolgeh Rokh District, Torbat-e Heydarieh County, Razavi Khorasan Province, Iran. At the 2006 census, its population was 60, in 19 families.

See also 

 List of cities, towns and villages in Razavi Khorasan Province

References 

Populated places in Torbat-e Heydarieh County